Ibrahim Suwayed Al-Shahrani (born 21 July 1974) is a former Saudi Arabian football player who played most of his career for Al-Ahli. He played for the Saudi Arabia national football team and was a participant at the 1998 FIFA World Cup and at the 2002 FIFA World Cup.

His most significant goal was against Qatar in Doha during the 1998 FIFA World Cup qualification (AFC) final match which eliminated Qatar and led Saudi Arabia to the top of Group A, directly qualifying to 1998 FIFA World Cup in France and leaving Iran in second place for the AFC Play-off against Japan.

International goals

Scores and results list Saudi Arabia's goal tally first.

References

External links

1974 births
Saudi Arabian footballers
Saudi Arabia international footballers
1997 FIFA Confederations Cup players
1998 FIFA World Cup players
1999 FIFA Confederations Cup players
2002 FIFA World Cup players
Living people
Abha Club players
Al-Ahli Saudi FC players
Ittihad FC players
Association football midfielders
Saudi Professional League players
People from Abha